Waddell Memorial Presbyterian Church is a historic Presbyterian church located near Rapidan, Orange County, Virginia.  It was built in 1874, and is a Carpenter Gothic frame building covered with board-and-batten siding.  It features a three-stage tower at the gable end with a ground level with an equilateral-arched doorway, a middle level with a rose window, and a belfry with double pointed windows.

It was added to the National Register of Historic Places in 1975.  It is located in the Rapidan Historic District.

References

Presbyterian churches in Virginia
Churches on the National Register of Historic Places in Virginia
Carpenter Gothic church buildings in Virginia
Gothic Revival church buildings in Virginia
Churches completed in 1874
Buildings and structures in Orange County, Virginia
National Register of Historic Places in Orange County, Virginia
Individually listed contributing properties to historic districts on the National Register in Virginia
Churches in Virginia